Odorrana trankieni, also known as Trankien frog or Tran Kien's odorous frog, is a species of frogs in the family Ranidae. It is endemic to northern Vietnam.

References

trankieni
Frogs of Asia
Amphibians of Vietnam
Endemic fauna of Vietnam
Amphibians described in 2003
Taxa named by Nikolai Loutseranovitch Orlov
Taxonomy articles created by Polbot